Hypotia argentalis is a species of snout moth in the genus Hypotia. It was described by George Hampson in 1900, and it is known from Israel, Iran, Syria, Algeria and Senegal.

References

Moths described in 1900
Hypotiini